Music Fest Perugia is a summer classical music festival held annually since 2007 in Perugia, Italy for high-level young classical musicians.

Formation
The festival was founded by Ilana Vered and Peter Hermes in 2006 in Monte Castello di Vibio, Italy hosting 8 students in its first year. In 2007 the festival moved to the city of Perugia and has since grown, currently hosting more than 200 students, 50 professors and multiple orchestras.

It is currently under the management of artistic director Ilana Vered and her former student, Sasha Starcevich, an internationally-renowned piano teacher, who serves as co-director. Peter Hermes is the executive director.

General information
The festival attracts advanced-level young classical musicians from all over the world, who get the opportunity to perform concerti with orchestra as well as participate in lessons and master classes and perform in marathon recitals and in chamber music events. The festival also produces an opera. The concerts take place in halls such as Basilica di San Pietro, Sala dei Notari, Teatro Pavone, most of them famous for their extraordinary acoustics.

Many of the festival's students have won prizes at national and international levels, including YoungArts, MTNA, Canadian Music Competition, Minnesota International Piano-e-Competition, Young Concert Artists, Van Cliburn International Piano Competition, Cleveland International Piano Competition, the Southeastern Piano Festival and many others. They have continued their education at prestigious universities and conservatories, including Stanford University, Columbia University, University of Pennsylvania, and The Juilliard School.

References

General references

External links
 List of mastersmusicfestperugia.net
 Students review of the festivalinterlude.hk
 Umbria News Article about the festival (video)

Tourist attractions in Umbria
Classical music festivals in Italy
Summer festivals
Perugia
Umbria